Ray Schultz (born November 14, 1976) is a Canadian former professional ice hockey defenceman who played 45 games for the New York Islanders in the National Hockey League; recording four assists and 155 penalty minutes.  Schultz was an eighth-round draft pick of the Ottawa Senators at the 1995 NHL Entry Draft.

Playing career
After a successful junior career in the Western Hockey League and un-signed from the Sentors, Schultz agreed to an entry-level deal with the New York Islanders as a free agent on June 9, 1997. Schultz spent the next six seasons within the Islanders organization as a depth defenceman, before leaving as a free agent in signing a contract with the Nashville Predators on July 17, 2003. In the following 2003–04 season, with the Predators American Hockey League affiliate, the Milwaukee Admirals, Schultz's veteran experience was looked upon in helping the Admirals claim the Calder Cup.

On July 6, 2004, having left the Predators as a free agent, Schultz signed a two-year contract with the New Jersey Devils. During his final year under contract in the 2005–06 season, Schultz was included in a trade by the Devils, along with Pascal Rheaume and Steven Spencer to the Phoenix Coyotes in exchange for Brad Ference on November 25, 2005. He featured in just 16 games with the Coyotes affiliate, the San Antonio Rampage before he was loaned to fellow AHL club, the Springfield Falcons to conclude his professional career.

Career statistics

Awards and honours

References

External links 
 

1976 births
Albany River Rats players
Bridgeport Sound Tigers players
Calgary Hitmen players
Cleveland Lumberjacks players
Sportspeople from Red Deer, Alberta
Kansas City Blades players
Kelowna Rockets players
Kentucky Thoroughblades players
Living people
Lowell Lock Monsters players
Milwaukee Admirals players
New York Islanders players
Ottawa Senators draft picks
San Antonio Rampage players
Springfield Falcons players
Tri-City Americans players
Ice hockey people from Alberta
Canadian ice hockey defencemen